The flag of Quebec City was officially adopted on January 12, 1987.

Design and symbolism 
The flag depicts a gold colored ship on a deep blue field surrounded by a crenelated white border representing its unique city walls. The border also signifies the fortified city its founder came from, Brouage in Saintonge, France.

The ship is Samuel de Champlain's ship, Don de Dieu, a reminder of the city's founder. The outward sails symbolize the bravery and strength of the population. The ship also signifies the city as being a major seaport in North America. 

The heraldic colours used have the following meaning:

Yellow (or) represents strength, justice, consistency, wealth, faith and luster.
White (argent) stands for purity, truth, charity, humility, and victory.
Blue (azure) means loyalty, clarity, sovereignty, majesty, good reputation, knowledge and serenity. Blue is also predominant in the city's coat of arms to emphasize its foundation by the French.

Gallery

Historical flags

Notes

 Flags of cities in Quebec
Flag
 Flags introduced in 1987
Samuel de Champlain